Shūsuke Nomura (14 February 1935 – 20 October 1993) was a Japanese ethnic nationalist activist.  He is best remembered for his suicide in the offices of the newspaper Asahi Shimbun.

Life and career

In 1963 Nomura burned down the home of politician Ichirō Kōno, for which he served 12 years in prison. In 1977 he took four people hostage at the Japan Federation of Economic Organizations headquarters, for which he served another 6 years in prison. He continued to maintain that circumstances sometimes justified such violence.

Nomura and his Kaze no Kai ("Wind Party") ran in the 1992 Upper House election. The party was behind in the polls when the Asahi Shimbun published a cartoon in its weekly magazine in which the character for "lice" replaced the character for "wind" in "Kaze no Tō". In reaction, Nomura entered the offices of Asahi dressed in a kimono, proclaimed "" ("Asahi and I will die upon each other's swords"), and bowed in the direction of the Imperial Palace. He then shot himself with two pistols and died shortly after in the hospital. Media criticized Nomura's act as an attack on freedom of the press.

Legacy

In October 2013 NHK board member  distributed an essay at a memorial for Nomura in which she said that Emperor Akihito became a "living god" again when Nomura shot himself, "whatever [the postwar] Constitution might say".  Before Japan's loss in World War II, Japanese emperors had been deified, but the postwar constitution demoted the emperor to a symbolic, human role.

References

Works cited

 
 

1935 births
1993 deaths
Suicides by firearm in Japan
Japanese activists